Pyar Ka Live Show is a 2014 Indian Hindi-language romance film directed by Shailendra Singh Rajput and produced by Vinod Singh under the M. Film's Creations banner. The film was released on 21 February 2014.

Cast
Ishrat Ali
Rudraksh Pundhir
Rajni Mehta
Upasana Singh
Mushtaq Khan
Adi Irani
Shiva Rindani
Rajesh Sonune
Baby Arundahi Pathak

Plot
Pyar Ka Live Show is about young romance blooming and how the couple encounters various twists and turns in their simple love story.

References

External links
 

2014 films
2010s Hindi-language films
Films shot in Mumbai